Danny is an American sitcom that aired on CBS. The series was created, executive produced and starred Daniel Stern. It was one of the last comedies to air on CBS's Friday night lineup airing along with The Ellen Show which premiered at the same time. The series premiered on September 28, 2001, and was abruptly canceled on October 22, 2001, making it the first series of the 2001 U.S. television season to be canceled.

Premise
Danny is recently separated father struggling to raise his two teenage kids. Despite just turning 40, he still wants to pursue his lifelong dreams all while running the town's local community center.

Cast
 Daniel Stern as Danny
 Julia McIlvaine as Sally
 Jon Foster as Henry
 Roz Ryan as Chickie
 Robert Prosky as Lenny
 Vincent J. Burns as Vince
 Joely Fisher as Moly
 Mia Korf as Rachel

Episodes
The first two episodes of the series were directed by Peter Lauer.

References

External links
 
 

2000s American single-camera sitcoms
2001 American television series debuts
2001 American television series endings
CBS original programming
Television shows set in Maryland
English-language television shows
Television series by CBS Studios